Emma Thomas (born November 6, 1958) is a former rugby union player. She represented New Zealand and Bay of Plenty. She made her international debut on 31 August 1996 against Australia at Sydney. She competed at the 1998 Women's Rugby World Cup.

Thomas made her last appearance for the Black Ferns on 29 August 1998 against Australia at Sydney.

References 

1958 births
Living people
New Zealand women's international rugby union players
New Zealand female rugby union players